Dr. K. Laxman is an Indian politician from the state of Telangana who  currently the National President for Bharatiya Janata Party's OBC Morcha since 26 September 2020. He was a former State President of Bharatiya Janata Party in Telangana from 2016 to 2020. He formerly represented Musheerabad Assembly constituency twice as MLA from 1999-2004 in Andhra Pradesh Assembly and from 2014-2018 in Telangana Legislative Assembly.

Early life
Dr. K. Laxman was born in a middle class family to Kova Ramulu & Kova Mangamma in Hyderabad, Telangana. He pursued his education in Hyderabad and has completed his M.Sc. from PG Centre, Osmania University. Further, he secured his Ph.D. from Department of Geology, Osmania University.

Political career
As a student, he joined ABVP at Osmania University and in the year 1980, he joined  Bharatiya Janata Party. Though he had an opportunity to get into a lucrative job given the demand that the subject had, driven by a passion for public service, he entered politics. Since then, he rose to various levels within the party right from Hyderabad City General Secretary in 1994, through to Hyderabad City President from 1995-1999. He contested for the first time from Musheerabad Assembly Constituency in 1994 and lost narrowly to Congress Candidate Kodanda Reddy but then got elected from the same constituency in 1999 with a huge margin of 18,567 votes. He was also chosen as Deputy Floor Leader during the then AP Legislative Assembly. In the years 2004 and 2009, he lost by slender margins against Congress candidates.

He was elected as MLA for the second time from  Musheerabad Assembly constituency in 2014 Telangana Assembly election. In the year 2016, he was appointed BJP Telangana State President by BJP National President - Amit Shah and Prime Minister - Shri. Narendra Modi. He was representing Musheerabad Assembly Constituency as MLA till 2018 and also worked as State President for Bharatiya Janata Party in Telangana until 2020.

National President of BJP's OBC Morcha

Dr Laxman, was appointed the President of the National OBC Morcha, on 26 September 2020.

Telangana Legislative Assembly Election, 2014

Personal life
Dr K Laxman is married to Uma and the couple are blessed with two daughters Swetha, Shruthi and a son Rahul.

Controversy
Laxman sparked a controversy over Sania Mirza being made the brand ambassador of Telangana by calling her Pakistan’s "daughter-in-law" after her marriage to cricketer Shoaib Malik and unfit to be a representative of an Indian state. This sparked outrage and drew a fierce response from Sania who said she will remain an Indian until the "end of her life".

References

Living people
People from Telangana
Telangana politicians
Bharatiya Janata Party politicians from Telangana
Telugu politicians
Telangana MLAs 2014–2018
1956 births
State Presidents of Bharatiya Janata Party